Too Many may refer to:
 "Too Many" (Wuda & King Dyl song)
 "Too Many" (Saweetie song)
 "Too Many" (Juicy J song)